Jónas Ásgeirsson (25 August 1920 – 14 June 1996) was an Icelandic ski jumper. He competed in the individual event at the 1948 Winter Olympics.

References

1920 births
1996 deaths
Icelandic male ski jumpers
Olympic ski jumpers of Iceland
Ski jumpers at the 1948 Winter Olympics
20th-century Icelandic people